Current Approaches in Psychiatry (Turkish:  Psikiyatride Güncel Yaklaşımla) is a quarterly online peer-reviewed medical journal publishing review articles on all aspects of psychiatry and related sciences (i.e. behavioral sciences, psychology, psychopharmacology, neuropsychiatry, neurosciences, psychiatric nursing). Articles are in Turkish or English.

Abstracting and indexing 
The journal is abstracted and indexed in:

See also
 List of psychiatry journals

External links
 
 Alternative website 

Psychiatry journals
Quarterly journals
Publications established in 2009
Open access journals
Multilingual journals